Nikolaos "Nikos" Deligiannis (born 3 September 1976 in Athens) is a Greek former water polo player who competed in the 2000 Summer Olympics (10th place), the 2004 Summer Olympics (4th place), the 2008 Summer Olympics (7th place) and the 2012 Summer Olympics (9th place) with the Greece men's national water polo team. He was also part of the Greece national squad who won the Bronze Medal in the 2005 World Championship in Montreal and the Bronze Medal in the 2004 World League in Long Beach.

At club level, Deligiannis had a long and successful career playing for Greek powerhouse Olympiacos for 14 years (2001–2015), with whom he won 1 LEN Champions League, 1 LEN Super Cup, 12 Greek Championships and 12 Greek Cups. He was also captain of Olympiacos for several years.

Honours

Club
Olympiacos
 LEN Euroleague (1): 2001–02
 LEN Super Cup (1): 2002
 Greek Championship (12): 2002, 2003, 2004, 2005, 2007, 2008, 2009, 2010, 2011, 2013, 2014, 2015
 Greek Cup (12): 2002, 2003, 2004, 2006, 2007, 2008, 2009, 2010, 2011, 2013, 2014, 2015

National team
  Bronze Medal in 2005 World Championship, Montreal
  Bronze Medal in 2004 World League, Long Beach
 4th place in 2004 Olympic Games, Athens
 4th place in 2003 World Championship, Barcelona

See also
 Greece men's Olympic water polo team records and statistics
 List of players who have appeared in multiple men's Olympic water polo tournaments
 List of men's Olympic water polo tournament goalkeepers
 List of World Aquatics Championships medalists in water polo

References

External links
 

1976 births
Living people
Greek male water polo players
Water polo goalkeepers
Olympiacos Water Polo Club players
Olympic water polo players of Greece
Water polo players at the 2000 Summer Olympics
Water polo players at the 2004 Summer Olympics
Water polo players at the 2008 Summer Olympics
Water polo players at the 2012 Summer Olympics
World Aquatics Championships medalists in water polo
Water polo players from Athens